Drosera brevifolia (the dwarf, small or red sundew), is a carnivorous plant of the family Droseraceae and is the smallest sundew species native to the United States. This species differs considerably from the pink sundew, Drosera capillaris, by its wedge-shaped leaves, and distinctly deeper red to reddish purple color, noticeable when side by side with D. capillaris.

D. brevifolia is usually a small plant, typically no more than 3 centimeters across, though some are known to grow up to 5 cm in the open sandy woods in west Louisiana, with flower spikes up to 15 cm. It is often found growing in areas drier than what most carnivorous plants prefer, where it often will set seed and die when the dry hot summer arrives and return as seedlings in late fall or winter.

The range of D. brevifolia is from east Texas to Florida and north to Virginia. Flowers can be large compared to the rosette and can be pink or white and come in the spring.

Most of the plants die off in the dry summer after setting seed. New seedlings return in the fall with cooler, damper weather.

According to the USDA, it is endangered in the State of Kentucky and threatened in the State of Tennessee.

References

 Key to North American Drosera species
 International Carnivorous Plant Society

brevifolia
Carnivorous plants of North America